Step Into My World is a compilation album by British rock band Hurricane #1, released in 2004. The anthology is a 30-track double album including previously unreleased tracks, rare B-sides and remixes. In addition the anthology features a picture sleeve and extensive liner notes written by Andy Bell.

Track listing 

Disc one

Disc two

2004 compilation albums